Thomas Leeke Massie (20 October 1802 – 20 July 1898) was an officer of the Royal Navy, who rose to the rank of admiral.

Life
He was born at Coddington Hall, Cheshire, on 20 October 1802. He entered the navy in October 1818 on board , flagship in the Mediterranean of Sir Thomas Francis Fremantle, and later on of Sir Graham Moore.

He was rewarded with promotion to lieutenant on a death vacancy, on 11 November 1827. As a lieutenant he served mostly in the Channel, North Sea, and Lisbon station. On 28 June 1838, Queen Victoria's coronation, he was made commander; and in 1839 was, with some others, sent out to Constantinople to assist in organising the Ottoman Navy. In the Thunderer he took part in the operations on the coast of Syria in the summer and autumn of 1840, during the Oriental Crisis of 1840, culminating in the capture of Acre, for which he was promoted to be captain on 17 March 1841.

In September 1854 he commissioned , which during the latter part of 1855 and 1856 was on the North American station. He had no further service, but became rear-admiral on 7 November 1860, vice-admiral on 2 April 1866, and admiral on 20 October 1872, being placed on the retired list in 1866. He died at Chester on 20 July 1898.

References

1802 births
1898 deaths
Royal Navy admirals
Royal Navy personnel of the Egyptian–Ottoman War (1839–1841)
British military personnel of the Greek War of Independence
Military personnel from Cheshire
British military personnel of the Second Anglo-Burmese War